Josh Kaufman (born November 9, 1976) is an American soul singer and singer-songwriter. A native of the Tampa Bay area in Florida, Kaufman is based out of and resides in Indianapolis, Indiana. He is best known for winning the season 6 of NBC's The Voice as a member of Usher's team and previously Adam Levine's team.

Early life
Kaufman was born in Sarasota, Florida, the son of Beth Gilbert, minister of music at Slusser's Chapel in Blacksburg, Virginia; and Mark Kaufman, who runs a roofing company. His stepfather, Rev. Richard Gilbert, is the pastor at a church in Blacksburg, Virginia. While in Blacksburg, he was a member of the Blacksburg High School Madrigals, an elite choir. He grew up and attended school in Lake Wales, Florida until his first year of high school. He and his mother moved to Blacksburg, Virginia where he attended and graduated from Blacksburg High School. His musical talent appeared early in his life. At sixteen, he appeared on Star Search and in 2011, Kaufman auditioned for the first season of Simon Cowell's The X Factor (U.S.). After living his teen years in Virginia, Kaufman settled in Anderson, Indiana to attend Anderson University and graduated from IUPUI. 
   
Kaufman is a member of the band The New Etiquette (formerly known as Josh Kaufman and the Frequency), an Indianapolis based rock and soul band. The band was formed in 2010 with original band members Josh Kaufman, Ryan Koch, and Nate Gray.  The band released a six track self-titled EP in spring 2012 drawing on the musical talents of several local musicians. 

From 2011 to 2014 Kaufman was a musical staple at Potbelly Sandwich Shop in Indianapolis, and also worked as an SAT prep tutor.

Career

The Voice (2014)
On the fifth episode of the Blind Auditions broadcast on March 10, 2014, he performed George Michael's song "One More Try." All four judges turned their chairs and Kaufman chose to join team Adam. Kaufman defeated fellow Team Adam member Austin Ellis in the Battles, Round 1. Kaufman lost his second battle round competition against Delvin Choice but was immediately stolen by Team Usher. Kaufman received the first iTunes bonus multiplier of the season, with his studio recording of "Stay With Me" reaching the fifth position on the iTunes Top 200 Singles chart at the close of the voting window. 

On May 20, 2014, Kaufman was announced as the winner of Season 6 of The Voice.

 – Studio version of performance reached the top 10 on iTunes

Later career
Kaufman participated in the Indy Jazz Fest in September 2014. Kaufman appeared at the Indiana State Fair in August 2014. He was the final actor to play the title role in the 2013 Broadway revival of Pippin, which closed in early 2015. 

On June 8, 2017, Josh Kaufman performed the anthem of the United States in the United States vs. Trinidad And Tobago FIFA World Cup CONCACAF Eliminatory match in 
Dick's Sporting Goods Park Commerce City, Colorado

Broadway 
Kaufman sung on Broadway in the show "Home For the Holidays, Live on Broadway" which was presented November 17 to December 30, 2017, at the August Wilson Theatre. Other vocal performers included Candice Glover, Bianca Ryan, Peter Hollens and Evynne Hollens.

Personal life
Kaufman is married to Jennifer Myer and they have five children as of November 2016.  They live in Carmel, Indiana (an Indianapolis suburb) where Kaufman sings with his band The New Etiquette.

Discography

Albums
 The New Etiquette (2012) 
Do You Want Love
On Me
That Train
Falling Again
Waving Goodbye
Out the Door

 Josh Kaufman (2016)
Truth Be Told
All I Ask
Avalanche
Paycheck
The World
Digging Deep

Singles
The New Etiquette (2012)
"Do You Want Love (Radio Only)"

Releases from The Voice

Albums

Singles

References

|-

1976 births
21st-century American singers
American soul singers
Living people
Musicians from Indianapolis
The Voice (franchise) winners
Writers from Indianapolis
People from Sarasota, Florida